Rahdari is a centuries old village and one of the 51 union councils (administrative subdivisions) of Khushab District in the Punjab Province of Pakistan. It was founded by the Tiwana's of Mitha Tiwana to collect tax on this major trade route of the Tiwana State. This is why it is called "Rahdari which means 'Trade Route'. The founders of this village were settled here by the head of Tiwana Biradri of Mitha Tiwana. The founding fathers  of this village were later known as Rahdari branch of Tiwana Biradri. 
The Union Council is part of the Noorpur Thal. It is connected with the roads from Noorpur Thal to Quaidabad and from Noorpur Thal to Jandanwala. Rahdari is the part of the third largest desert in Pakistan. Most of the area is barren wasteland with scanty drought resistant trees, shrubs and grasses. The main activity in the region is cattle rearing. Mostly people are earning from their agricultural lands. People grow grams and wheat. Rahdari is the 12th biggest village in Noorpur Thal Tehsil after Chan. Union Council Rahdari consists of Rahdari with a population of 7554 respectively Shah Wala 4473, Mehmood Shaheed 4066, Chak No. 52DB 1073, 53DB 909, and 54 DB 435. Total population of Union Council is 22,631. Major casts of the area are Rahdari Tiwana, Khokhar, Aheer, Pahore, Dhudi, Sheikh, Bamb, Malana etc

References

Union councils of Khushab District
Populated places in Khushab District